H.100 and H.110 are legacy telephony equipment standard published by the ECTF that allow the transport of up to 4096 simplex channels of voice or data on one connector or ribbon cable.   H.100 is implemented using Multi-Channeled Buffered Serial Ports (McBSP), typically included as a DSP peripheral.  McBSP, also known as TDM Serial ports are special serial ports that support multiple channels by using Time-division multiplexing (TDM).

The McBSP / TDM Serial Port Interface is as follow:
 CK: Clock
 FS: Frame Sync
 DR: Data Receive
 DX: Data Transmit

See also
 Time-division multiple access
 TDM Bus

External links
H100

References

Telephony